Colchester was a provincial electoral district in Nova Scotia, Canada, that elected two members to the Nova Scotia House of Assembly. It existed from 1867 to 1978 and included all of Colchester County. In 1978, Colchester was divided into three electoral districts, Colchester North, Colchester South, and Truro-Bible Hill.

Election results

1867 general election

1871 general election

1874 general election

1878 general election

1882 general election

1886 general election

1890 general election

1894 general election

1897 general election

1901 general election

1906 general election

1911 general election

1916 general election

1920 general election

1925 general election

1928 general election

1933 general election

1937 general election

1941 general election

1945 general election

1949 general election

1953 general election

1956 general election

1960 general election

1963 general election

1967 general election

1970 general election

1974 general election

References

Elections Nova Scotia - Summary Results from 1867 to 2011 (PDF)

Former provincial electoral districts of Nova Scotia